Lubusz Voivodeship, or Lubuskie Province, is a voivodeship (province) in western Poland.

It was created on January 1, 1999, out of the former Gorzów Wielkopolski and Zielona Góra Voivodeships, pursuant to the Polish local government reforms adopted in 1998. The province's name recalls the historic Lubusz Land (Lebus or Lubus), although parts of the voivodeship belong to the historic regions of Silesia, Greater Poland and Lusatia. Until 1945, it mainly formed the Neumark within the Prussian Province of Brandenburg.

The functions of regional capital are shared between two cities: Gorzów Wielkopolski and Zielona Góra. Gorzów serves as the seat of the centrally-appointed voivode, or governor, and Zielona Góra is the seat of the elected regional assembly (sejmik) and the executive elected by that assembly, headed by a marshal (marszałek). In addition, the voivodeship includes a third city (Nowa Sól) and a number of towns. 

The region is mainly flat, with many lakes and woodlands. In the south, around Zielona Góra, grapes are cultivated.

Lubusz Voivodeship borders West Pomeranian Voivodeship to the north, Greater Poland Voivodeship to the east, Lower Silesian Voivodeship to the south, and Germany (Brandenburg and Saxony) to the west.

History

By conquest the first leaders of the Polans, Mieszko I and especially Bolesław I added a number of surrounding territories to the newly established core Polish state, and Lebus Land or Lubusz in Lusatia came under Polish rule. Part of the historic province was located on the western bank of the Oder River, where the main settlement Lubusz, later known as the German town of Lebus, was located.

In 1250 Lebus Land it was acquired by the Ascanian margraves of Brandenburg. The Lebus Land stayed with Brandenburg throughout (as Electorate within the Holy Roman Empire until 1806, as Prussian Province of Brandenburg since 1815, with Prussia as part of the new Empire of Germany since 1871 and thereafter as a part of the newly created Weimar Republic.

In 1945, the conquest of eastern Germany by the Soviet Red Army was followed by the redrawing of Poland's borders. The eastern part of the Lubusz (Lebus) region was transferred to Poland and became part of the "Recovered Territories". The German-speaking population which had not fled west of the Oder was subsequently expelled, and replaced by Poles from central and former eastern Poland. 

In 1998, the government of Jerzy Buzek decided to introduce an administrative reform, with its principles including the restoration of counties and a steep reduction in the number of voivodeships. A general consensus existed among scholars that the local administration exercised through the 49 existing voivodeships established in 1975 was inefficient, anachronistic, impractical, detrimental to maintaining regional identity, and untenable. However, the reform draft accepted by the government surprised the public and caused widespread outcry, as its authors foresaw creation of only 12 large voivodships, thus going much further than the widely expected reconstitution of the 17 voivodeships existing prior to the 1975 reform. As a consequence, the original draft made no provision for a separate Lubusz voivodeship – Gorzów was to become along with Kostrzyn, Strzelce Krajeńskie and Drezdenko a part of West Pomeranian Voivodeship, Zielona Góra was to be included along with Krosno, Nowa Sól, Żagań, Gubin and Żary in the Lower Silesian Voivodeship, while a narrow horizontal strip encompassing  Międzyrzecz, Sulęcin, Świebodzin, Słubice and Sulechów was to be assigned to the Greater Poland Voivodeship as a bizarre sort-of corridor to the German border. However, mass protests broke out as a result in the cities such as Bydgoszcz, Koszalin, Opole or Kielce. Many of the people opposing the draft reform initially demanded retaining as many as 25 voivodeships (including the 2 ones seated in Gorzów and Zielona Góra), a number nevertheless widely regarded as a demand intentionally excessive to serve as an initial negotiating bargain, actually aiming to restore the 17 voivodeships existing prior to 1975 as an ultimate compromise. As Poland was at the time governed under political cohabitation, the opposition party constituting the political background of the President decided to capitalize on the popular discontent which erupted against the government on an unanticipated scale; the most obvious mean readily available for the opposition was a presidential veto, which in fact ensued. In order to salvage the reform from being killed altogether, the government was, in the face of lacking the supermajority required to overturn the veto at the time, forced to reconsider the original shape of the reform and to reconcile it with the reservations of the President and his political background, with the result of a compromise adjustment increasing the number of voivodeships to 16, with Lubusz Voivodeship included among the four additional ones created according to the agreement.

The path leading to such and outcome was far from smooth. The government made an effort to highlight and exploit the decades-long animosity between the approximately same-size two principal cities, spreading scare against its inevitable re-ignition and explosion in any of these two cities after designating the other one as the voivodeship capital, and hoping to use the engineered scare as the main argument in the ongoing discussions against creating the Lubusz voivodeship, The animosity, existing indeed between the cities, has been historically rooted in a widespread perception among Gorzów inhabitants that the 1950 decision to designate Zielona Góra as the voivodeship capital instead of their larger and more populous city, was taken by the anticlerical communist government due to a hidden motivation of punishing Gorzów for becoming the see of the newly established Roman Catholic apostolic administration governing the majority of the Recovered Territories, with the ensuing discrimination of the city by the voivodeship authorities in the years 1950-1975 in terms of establishing any new public cultural and educational institutions, other public investments or public funds allocations, in vivid contrast to the unjust favoring of their own seat, the city of Zielona Góra; a sentiment reinforced further by the surprise relocation of the see of the Roman Catholic Diocese of Gorzów to Zielona Góra in 1992, renamed as a result the Roman Catholic Diocese of Zielona Góra-Gorzów, and finally and perhaps most importantly, by the historical, perpetual and almost sacred rivalry between the motorcycle speedway clubs located in both cities. The objective of the local elites in Zielona Góra was in turn to become a single capital centre, reverting to the situation before 1975, while any prospect of sharing the governing institutions was for a long time treated with their hostility. In spite of that, the looming threat of a "everybody lose" scenario set to materialize in case of a possible implementation of the original reform draft, paved the way for neutralizing this argument through forcing both rival sides into the breakthrough reconciliation accord known as the Paradyż Agreement, brokered by the Roman Catholic Diocese of Zielona Góra-Gorzów and formalized in a document signed during a highly publicized local summit in the Gościkowo-Paradyż Abbey on 13 March 1998. This compromise agreement, was negotiated and concluded between the delegations of both rival cities, composed of the respectively aligned most powerful local and national scene politicians and business people, with its most important provision being the unusual arrangement to divide and distribute the governing institutions of the voivodeship more or less equally between the two cities. On the basis of this broadly supported agreement, an effective public pressure endorsed jointly by the two centers was successfully exerted on the central government which ultimately acquiesced to the demand of establishing Lubusz Voivodeship. 

Nevertheless, creating any new type of public institution at voivodeship level in Poland continues to ignite almost automatically a fierce battle in the Lubusz Voivodeship regarding the seat of the institution. There have also been numerous attempts to relocate some of the existing public institutions under various pretexts from one city to another, in some cases successful, as well as of merging a pair of equal institutions of a type existing in both cities, in order to make one of them a branch of the other,  with obscure or no justification in most cases for such merger. Nevertheless, a general local majority consensus prevails that the compromise, although unsatisfactory for any of the two cities, spared both of them the fate of a number of cities which lost in 1999 entirely the status of a voivodeship capital and all voivodeship-level institutions, along with the associated attractiveness and prestige of the city as a place to live, crucial for its growth, with the ensuing profoundly detrimental phenomena.

Geography 
The Lubusz Voivodeship is a land of forests and lakes; forests cover 48% of the area. The river Oder, flowing through the voivodeship, is one of the few large European rivers retaining broadleaved and riparian forests. Areas with the highest natural values are protected as wildlife reserves, national parks (the Drawieński National Park and the Warta Estuary National Park) and landscape parks. The 19th century Mużakowski Park, located on both sides of the Polish-German border, has entered the UNESCO World Heritage List. The voivodeship abounds in lakes, especially in its central and northern parts; around those lakes numerous bathing resorts, holiday centres and farms offering tourist services have been established.

Cities and towns

The voivodeship contains 3 cities and 40 towns. These are listed below in descending order of population (as of 2021):

Administrative division
Lubusz Voivodeship is divided into 14 counties (powiats): 2 city counties and 12 land counties. These are further divided into 82 gminas.

The counties are listed in the following table (ordering within categories is by decreasing population).

Economy
The Gross domestic product (GDP) of the province was 10.8 billion euros in 2018, accounting for 2.2% of Polish economic output. GDP per capita adjusted for purchasing power was 17,600 euros or 58% of the EU27 average in the same year. The GDP per employee was 67% of the EU average.

Protected areas

Protected areas in Lubusz Voivodeship include two National Parks and eight Landscape Parks. These are listed below.
Drawa National Park (partly in Greater Poland and West Pomeranian Voivodeships)
Ujście Warty National Park
Ujście Warty Landscape Park (partly in West Pomeranian Voivodeship)
Barlinek-Gorzów Landscape Park (partly in West Pomeranian Voivodeship)
Gryżyna Landscape Park
Krzesin Landscape Park
Łagów Landscape Park
Muskau Bend Landscape Park (UNESCO World Heritage Site)
Przemęt Landscape Park (partly in Greater Poland Voivodeship)
Pszczew Landscape Park (partly in Greater Poland Voivodeship)

See also
Roman Catholic Diocese of Zielona Góra-Gorzów
German exonyms (Lubusz Voivodeship)

References

External links
Polish Government Link, Lands conquered by Mieszko I and Boleslaw I 
Official website of Lubusz Voivodeship
- Tourism in Lubuskie - TURYSTYKA

 
States and territories established in 1999